The following is a list of California ballot propositions broken down by decade.  Propositions can be placed on the ballot either through the exercise of the initiative power by the voters or by a vote of the state legislature. The state initiative power was added to the California constitution in 1911 as part of the ethics reform instituted by Governor Hiram Johnson in the early 1910s.

By decade 

 1880–1889
 1890–1899
 1900–1909
 1910–1919
 1920–1929
 1930–1939
 1940–1949
 1950–1959
 1960–1969
 1970–1979
 1980–1989
 1990–1999
 2000–2009
 2010–2019
 2020–2029

History

Ballot measures were not numbered prior to the general election of 1914.  Until the November 1982 general election, proposition numbers started with "1" for each election.  After November 1982, subsequent propositions received sequentially increasing numbers until November 1998 when the count was reset to "1".  Starting with November 1998, the count is reset in 10-year cycles.

Until 1960, citizen-led initiative measures appeared on general election ballots only. From 1960 to 2012, initiative measures appeared on primary, general, and special election ballots. In October 2011, Governor Jerry Brown signed into law a bill (Senate Bill No. 202) which requires all future ballot initiatives to be listed only in general elections (held in November in even-numbered years), rather than during any statewide election. Two propositions had already qualified for the next statewide election (which was the June 2012 presidential primaries) prior to the signing of the law, making the June 2012 primaries the last statewide non-general election in California to have statewide initiatives on the ballot.  Propositions originating in the State Legislature can still appear on non-general election ballots, as was the case with Propositions 41 and 42 in June 2014.

Notable propositions
Some notable propositions which have received a great deal of attention include:

See also
Elections in California

References

External links
California Ballot Measures Database from University of California, Hastings College of the Law Library, a comprehensive, searchable source of information on California ballot propositions and initiatives from 1911 to the present

Ballot propositions
California ballot propositions
California